The family Flavobacteriaceae is composed of environmental bacteria. Most species are aerobic, while some are microaerobic to anaerobic; for example Capnocytophaga and Coenonia.

Genera
The family Flavobacteriaceae comprises the following genera:

 Actibacter Kim et al. 2008
 Aequorivita Bowman and Nichols 2002
 Aestuariibaculum Jeong et al. 2013

 Aestuariimonas Park et al. 2018
 Aestuariivivens Park et al. 2015
 Algibacter Nedashkovskaya et al. 2004
 Algitalea Yoon et al. 2015
 "Algorimicrobium" García-López et al. 2019
 "Altibacter" Chen et al. 2014
 "Altuibacter" Chen et al. 2013
 Amniculibacterium Chen et al. 2020
 "Candidatus Amoebinatus" Greub et al. 2004
 Antarcticibacterium Li et al. 2018
 Antarcticimonas Yang et al. 2014
 Aquaticitalea Xamxidin et al. 2016
 Aquibacter Hameed et al. 2014
 Aquimarina Nedashkovskaya et al. 2005
 Arcticiflavibacter Liu et al. 2016
 Arenibacter Ivanova et al. 2001
 Arenitalea Zhang et al. 2013
 "Ascidiaceibacter" Chen et al. 2018
 Ascidiimonas Yoon et al. 2016
 Aurantiacicella Teramoto et al. 2016
 Aurantibacter García-López et al. 2020
 Aurantivirga Song et al. 2015
 Aureibaculum Zhao et al. 2021
 Aureicoccus Park et al. 2013
 Aureisphaera Yoon et al. 2015
 Aureitalea Park et al. 2012
 Aureivirga Haber et al. 2013
 "Avrilella" Leyer et al. 2020
 Bizionia Nedashkovskaya et al. 2005
 Capnocytophaga Leadbetter et al. 1982
 Cellulophaga Johansen et al. 1999
 Changchengzhania Wang et al. 2017
 "Citreibacter" Yoon et al. 2018
 Citreitalea Yoon et al. 2014
 "Cochleicola" Shin et al. 2016
 Coenonia Vandamme et al. 1999
 Confluentibacter Park et al. 2016
 "Coraliitalea" Yoon et al. 2018
 Corallibacter Kim et al. 2012
 Costertonia Kwon et al. 2006
 Croceibacter Cho and Giovannoni 2003
 Croceitalea Lee et al. 2008
 Croceivirga Hu et al. 2017
 Daejeonia Siddiqi et al. 2017
 Dokdonia Yoon et al. 2005

 "Candidatus Endobryopsis" Zan et al. 2019
 Eudoraea Alain et al. 2008
 Euzebyella Lucena et al. 2010
 Faecalibacter Chen et al. 2020
 "Feifantangia" Zheng et al. 2015

 Flavicella Teramoto and Nishijima 2015
 Flavihalobacter Yin et al. 2021
 Flavimarina Nedashkovskaya et al. 2015
 Flaviramulus Einen and Øvreås 2006

 Flavivirga Yi et al. 2012
 Flavobacterium Bergey et al. 1923 (Approved Lists 1980)
 Formosa Ivanova et al. 2004
 Frondibacter Yoon et al. 2015
 "Fucobacter" Sakai et al. 2002
 Fulvibacter Khan et al. 2008
 Gaetbulibacter Jung et al. 2005

 Galbibacter Khan et al. 2007
 Gangjinia Lee et al. 2011
 Gelatiniphilus Tang et al. 2016
 Gelidibacter Bowman et al. 1997
 Geojedonia Park et al. 2013
 Gillisia Van Trappen et al. 2004
 Gilvibacter Khan et al. 2007
 Gramella Nedashkovskaya et al. 2005
 Haloflavibacter Feng et al. 2020
 Hanstruepera Hameed et al. 2015
 "Candidatus Hemobacterium" Zhang and Rikihisa 2004
 Hoppeia Kwon et al. 2014
 Hwangdonia Jung et al. 2013
 Hyunsoonleella Yoon et al. 2010
 Ichthyenterobacterium Shakeela et al. 2015
 Imtechella Surendra et al. 2012
 Jejudonia Park et al. 2013
 Jejuia Lee et al. 2009
 Joostella Quan et al. 2008
 Kordia Sohn et al. 2004
 Kriegella Nedashkovskaya et al. 2008

 Lacinutrix Bowman and Nichols 2005
 Leeuwenhoekiella Nedashkovskaya et al. 2005
 Leptobacterium Mitra et al. 2009
 Litoribaculum Jin and Jeon 2015
 Lutaonella Arun et al. 2009
 Lutibacter Choi and Cho 2006
 Lutimonas Yang et al. 2007
 Mangrovimonas Li et al. 2013
 Maribacter Nedashkovskaya et al. 2004
 Mariniflexile Nedashkovskaya et al. 2006
 Marinirhabdus Wu et al. 2016
 "Marinitalea" Kim et al. 2011
 Marinivirga Park et al. 2013

 Maritimimonas Park et al. 2009
 Marixanthomonas Romanenko et al. 2007
 Meridianimaribacter Wang et al. 2010
 Mesoflavibacter Asker et al. 2008
 Mesohalobacter Feng et al. 2020
 Mesonia Nedashkovskaya et al. 2003
 Muricauda Bruns et al. 2001
 Muriicola Kahng et al. 2010
 Myroides Vancanneyt et al. 1996
 Namhaeicola Jung et al. 2012
 Neptunitalea Yoon and Kasai 2015
 Nonlabens Lau et al. 2005
 Oceanihabitans Zhang et al. 2016
 "Ochrovirga" Kwon et al. 2014
 Olleya Mancuso Nichols et al. 2005
 Paramesonia Wang et al. 2020
 Pareuzebyella Huang et al. 2021
 Patiriisocius Kawano et al. 2020
 Paucihalobacter Wu et al. 2020
 Pelagihabitans Wang et al. 2020

 Pibocella Nedashkovskaya et al. 2005
 Planktosalinus Zhong et al. 2016
 Polaribacter Gosink et al. 1998
 Pontimicrobium Janthra et al. 2020

 Poritiphilus Wang et al. 2020
 Postechiella Lee et al. 2012
 Pricia Yu et al. 2012
 "Candidatus Prosiliicoccus" Francis et al. 2019
 Pseudobizionia Park et al. 2018
 Pseudofulvibacter Yoon et al. 2013
 Pseudotenacibaculum Huang et al. 2016
 Pseudozobellia Nedashkovskaya et al. 2009
 Psychroflexus Bowman et al. 1999
 Psychroserpens Bowman et al. 1997
 "Pukyongia" Kim et al. 2020
 Pustulibacterium Wang et al. 2013
 Robertkochia Hameed et al. 2014
 Robiginitalea Cho and Giovannoni 2004
 Sabulilitoribacter Park et al. 2014
 Salegentibacter McCammon and Bowman 2000
 Salinimicrobium Lim et al. 2008

 Saonia Fagervold et al. 2017
 Sediminibacter Khan et al. 2007
 Sediminicola Khan et al. 2006
 Seonamhaeicola Park et al. 2014
 Siansivirga Hameed et al. 2013
 Sinomicrobium Xu et al. 2013
 Snuella Yi and Chun 2011
 "Spodiobacter" Tomida et al. 2019

 Spongiiferula Yoon et al. 2016
 Spongiimicrobium Yoon et al. 2016
 Spongiivirga Yoon et al. 2015
 "Spongitalea" Mitra et al. 2012

 Subsaxibacter Bowman and Nichols 2005
 Subsaximicrobium Bowman and Nichols 2005
 "Sufflavibacter" Kwon et al. 2007
 Sungkyunkwania Yoon et al. 2013
 Taeania Jung et al. 2016
 Tamlana Lee 2007
 Tenacibaculum Suzuki et al. 2001
 Ulvibacter Nedashkovskaya et al. 2004
 Ulvibacterium Zhang et al. 2021
 Urechidicola Shin and Yi 2020
 "Vaginella" Diop et al. 2017

 Wenyingzhuangia Liu et al. 2014
 Winogradskyella Nedashkovskaya et al. 2005
 Wocania He et al. 2020
 Xanthomarina Vaidya et al. 2015
 Yeosuana Kwon et al. 2006
 Zeaxanthinibacter Asker et al. 2007
 Zhouia Liu et al. 2006
 Zobellia Barbeyron et al. 2001
 Zunongwangia corrig. Qin et al. 2007

Phylogeny
The currently accepted taxonomy is based on the List of Prokaryotic names with Standing in Nomenclature and the phylogeny is based on whole-genome sequences.

Notes

References

Flavobacteria